Gjøra Chapel is a chapel of the Church of Norway in Sunndal Municipality in Møre og Romsdal county, Norway. It is located in the village of Gjøra. It is an annex chapel in the Romfo parish which is part of the Indre Nordmøre prosti (deanery) in the Diocese of Møre. The brown, wooden chapel was built in a long church style in 1935 by the architect Johan Meyer. The chapel seats about 100 people.

History

In 1888, governmental permission was granted to build a cemetery in Gjøra to serve the far eastern portion of Sunndal so people didn't have to travel all the way to Romfo Church to bury their dead. Soon after, the residents began asking for permission to build a chapel at the site of the cemetery. In 1935, a new chapel was built at the site. It was designed by Johan Meyer. The chapel has a full basement which is the location of the church hall. The building was refurbished in 1964–1965.

See also
List of churches in Møre

References

External links
Architectural drawing of the chapel 

Sunndal
Churches in Møre og Romsdal
Long churches in Norway
Wooden churches in Norway
20th-century Church of Norway church buildings
Churches completed in 1935
1935 establishments in Norway